Ialomicioara River may refer to:

 Ialomicioara (left tributary), a left tributary of the Ialomița near Moroeni, Romania
 Ialomicioara (right tributary), a right tributary of the Ialomița near Fieni, Romania

See also 
 Ialomița (disambiguation)